Bolešov is a village and municipality in Ilava District in the Trenčín Region of north-western Slovakia.

History
In historical records the village was first mentioned in 1331.

Geography
The municipality lies at an altitude of 241 metres and covers an area of 14.951 km². It has a population of about 1465 people.

Genealogical resources

The records for genealogical research are available at the state archive "Statny Archiv in Bytca, Slovakia"

 Roman Catholic church records (births/marriages/deaths): 1700-1896 (parish A)

See also
 List of municipalities and towns in Slovakia

External links
  Official page
https://web.archive.org/web/20071116010355/http://www.statistics.sk/mosmis/eng/run.html
Surnames of living people in Bolesov

Villages and municipalities in Ilava District